The men's javelin throw at the 2014 IPC Athletics European Championships was held at the Swansea University Stadium from 18–23 August.

Medalists

Results

F12

F34

F37/38

F41

F42

F44

F46

F54

F56

F57

See also
List of IPC world records in athletics

References

Javelin Throw
Javelin throw at the World Para Athletics European Championships